The Military ranks of Tajikistan are the military insignia used by the Armed Forces of the Republic of Tajikistan. Being a former member of Soviet Union, Tajikistan shares a rank structure similar to that of Russia. Since 2018, the State Language Committee of Tajikistan operated a working group that sought to replace the Russian military ranks with pure Tajik/Persian terms. An example of this would be the rank of Colonel, which is currently "Полковник/Polkovnik" would be changed to "Сарлашкар/Sarlashkar". Tajikistan is a landlocked country, and does therefore not possess a navy.

Commissioned officer ranks
The rank insignia of commissioned officers.

Other ranks
The rank insignia of non-commissioned officers and enlisted personnel.

Name change
Guided by the principles of historicism, continuity, unification and standardization of military terminology between Persian-speaking states, the Committee on Language and Terminology, in 2018, invited the Ministry of Defense of the Republic of Tajikistan to adopt the names of formations from the Iranian Armed Forces and restore the historical names of units as follows:

Based on the fact that in the Persian-Tajik language military ranks traditionally come from the names of units and formations, the following military rank system for the Tajik Armed Forces was proposed:

Officers

Non-officer ranks 

The proposed system of Tajik military ranks sent to the National Security Council of Tajikistan.

References

External links
 

Tajikistan
Military of Tajikistan